The Parisian Tigress, also known by its working title Jeanne of the Gutter, is a 1919 American silent drama film, directed by Herbert Blaché. It stars Viola Dana, Darrell Foss, and Henry Kolker, and was released on March 31, 1919.

Cast list
 Viola Dana as Jeanne
 Darrell Foss as Albert Chauroy
 Henry Kolker as Henri Dutray
 Edward J. Connelly as Count de Suchet
 Clarissa Selwynne as Mlle. de Suchet
 Louis Darclay as Jacques, an Apache
 Paul Weigel as The elder Count de Suchet
 Mitzi Goodstadt as Mimi
 Maree Beaudet as Cisette

References

External links

 
 
 

Silent American drama films
American silent feature films
American black-and-white films
1919 drama films
1919 films
Metro Pictures films
Films directed by Herbert Blaché
1910s American films
1910s English-language films